The akakia (literally or "not-wickedness". a- "not" or "against", kakia "wickedness"), previously known as an anexikakia ("enduring wickedness", "forgiveness", "forbearance", "patience") was a cylindrical purple silk roll containing dust which is depicted in wall mosaics and on coinage as being held by Byzantine emperors during ceremonies.  It symbolized the mortal nature of all men. It possibly developed from the mappa, the cloth used by the Roman consuls to start the races at the hippodrome.

Sources 

 

Byzantine regalia